Kurakesh (also Romanized as Kūrākesh; also known as Korakesh) is a village in Arzil Rural District, Kharvana District, Varzaqan County, East Azerbaijan Province, Iran. At the 2006 census, its population was 165, in 44 families.

References 

Towns and villages in Varzaqan County